Jenny Craig Pavilion (JCP) is a 5,100 seat, multi-purpose arena, built in 2000 in San Diego, California, on the campus of the University of San Diego. It was named for weight-loss entrepreneur Jenny Craig. The Pavilion is sometimes affectionately known as the "Slim Gym", a punning reference to the weight-loss program founded by its namesake. It is the home of the University of San Diego Toreros men's and women's basketball and volleyball teams. Besides basketball, the Jenny Craig Pavilion is also used for many other campus and community events and concerts.

From 2001 to 2003, the arena was the site of the West Coast Conference men's basketball tournament, and hosted the tournament again in 2008.

See also
 List of NCAA Division I basketball arenas

References

External links
USD JCP homepage

Basketball venues in California
College basketball venues in the United States
College volleyball venues in the United States
Volleyball venues in California
San Diego Toreros basketball venues
Sports venues in San Diego
Sports venues completed in 2000
2000 establishments in California